Boaventura de Sousa Santos  (born November 15, 1940, in Coimbra, Portugal) is a Professor emeritus at the School of Economics at the University of Coimbra, Distinguished Legal Scholar at the University of Wisconsin-Madison Law School, Global Legal Scholar at the University of Warwick and Director Emeritus of the Centre for Social Studies (CES) at the University of Coimbra.

Career
Boaventura de Sousa Santos was born on November 15, 1940, in Coimbra, Portugal. He earned his undergraduate degree from the University of Coimbra in 1963 and a post-graduate diploma in jurisprudence in West Berlin. He went on to pursue a doctorate on the sociology of law at Yale University at the end of the 1960s. In 1973, he became one of the founders of the School of Economics at the University of Coimbra, where he opened a Sociology course. In the mid-1980s, he began to structurally adopt the role of a researcher whose understanding of the world extended beyond a Western perspective. He has been involved in research in Brazil, Cabo Verde, Macau, Mozambique, South Africa, Colombia, Bolivia, Ecuador and India. He has travelled widely, giving classes and lectures while also extending his range of experiences of learning in the process. He was one of the driving forces behind the World Social Forum, the spirit of which he considers essential to his studies of counter-hegemonic globalization and to promoting the struggle for global cognitive justice, an underlying concept of “Epistemologies of the South.”

He has written and published widely on the issues of globalization, sociology of law and the state, epistemology, social movements and the World Social Forum in Portuguese, Spanish, English, Italian, French, German, Chinese, Danish, Romanian and Polish. He has been awarded several prizes, most recently Frantz Fanon Lifetime Achievement 2022, by the Caribbean Philosophical Association; Science and Technology Prize of Mexico, 2010; the Kalven Jr. Prize of the Law and Society Association, 2011.

His most recent project - ALICE: Leading Europe to a New Way of Sharing the World Experiences - is funded by an Advanced Grant of the European Research Council (ERC), one of the most prestigious and highly competitive international financial institutes for scientific excellence in Europe. The project was initiated in July 2011 and enabled him to gather a team of young researchers from various different countries and academic backgrounds who are committed to collectively developing the lines of research that have emerged from the epistemological, theoretical-analytical and methodological premises of the work he has consolidated over many years. The main idea underlying ALICE is to create a decentered conception of the anti-imperial South, in which Africa and Asia also find their place in a broader and more liberating conversation of humankind.  A premise of ALICE is to bring to light the notion that the “Eurocentric world has not much to teach the wider world anymore and is almost incapable of learning from the experience of such a wider world, given the colonialist arrogance that still survives.”

Ideology

de Sousa Santos has been engaged in a process of re-discovering Marxism. While acknowledging the limits of Marxism, Santos has more recently described Marxism as an “ongoing discovery.” During his studies in West Berlin, he was immersed in a university community that aspired to democratic values, while living in the context of the Cold War. This also allowed him to experience the stark contrast between the communist influence in East Germany and the liberal democratic ideology in West Germany.

In 1970 de Sousa Santos traveled to Brazil in order to do field research for his doctoral dissertation. His work was focused on the social organization of the construction of parallel legality in illegal communities, the favelas or squatter settlements.

In the mid-1980s, he began to structurally adopt the role of a researcher whose understanding of the world extended beyond a Western perspective. His fieldwork was based on participant observation, lasting several months, in a Rio de Janeiro slum where he experienced the struggle of the excluded populations against oppression first hand. There, he learned from the wisdom of men and women struggling for subsistence and for recognition of their dignity. De Sousa Santos believes in the importance of the social scientist striving for objectivity, not neutrality.

Sociology of absences

Selected works
His PhD thesis has not only been considered a landmark in the Sociology of Law, but has greatly impacted his life. He has published widely on globalization, sociology of law and the state, epistemology, democracy and human rights, and his works have been published in Portuguese, Spanish, English, Italian, French, German and Mandarin.

Among his most recent and relevant publications are: 
 Toward a New Common Sense: Law, Science and Politics in the Paradigmatic Transition (Routledge, 1995)
 Toward a New Legal Common Sense. Law, globalization, and emancipation (Butterworths, 2002)
 The Rise of the Global Left. The World Social Forum and Beyond (Zed Books, 2006)
 Epistemologies of the South. Justice against Epistemicide (Paradigm Publishers, 2014)
 O Direito dos Oprimidos (Editora Almedina/Editora Cortez, 2014)
 A Justiça Popular em Cabo Verde (Editora Almedina/Editora Cortez, 2015) 
 Revueltas de Indignación y Otras Conversas (La Paz, 2015)
 If God Were a Human Rights Activist (Stanford University Press, 2015)
 The End of the Cognitive Empire (Duke University Press, 2018)

Distinctions

National orders
 Grand Officer of the Order of Saint James of the Sword (4 January 1996)

References

1940 births
Living people
Academic staff of the University of Coimbra
Portuguese legal scholars
Postcolonial theorists
Grand Officers of the Order of Saint James of the Sword